is a railway station on the Ainokaze Toyama Railway Line in the city of Oyabe, Toyama Prefecture, Japan, operated by the third-sector railway operator Ainokaze Toyama Railway.

Lines

Station layout
Isurugi Station has one side platform and one island platform connected by a footbridge.

Platforms

History
Isurugi Station opened on 1 November 1898 as a station on the Japanese Government Railway (JGR). It was privatized on 1 April 1984, becoming a station on JR West.

From this date, Isurugi Station was transferred to the ownership of the third-sector operating company Ainokaze Toyama Railway.

Adjacent stations

Passenger statistics
In fiscal 2015, the station was used by an average of 1,652 passengers daily (boarding passengers only).

Surrounding area
 National Route 471
 Mitsui Outlet Park, Hokuriku Oyabe

See also
 List of railway stations in Japan

References

External links

  

Railway stations in Toyama Prefecture
Railway stations in Japan opened in 1898
Ainokaze Toyama Railway Line
Oyabe, Toyama